Hurricane Run (2002–2016) was a world champion Irish-bred thoroughbred racehorse. He was the second French-trained horse, after his sire Montjeu, to win both the Prix de l'Arc de Triomphe and the King George VI and Queen Elizabeth Stakes. He was trained by André Fabre in France and ridden in all but one of his races by Christophe Soumillon or Kieren Fallon.

Background
Hurricane Run was bred by German breeders Gestüt Ammerland. The colt was a son of champion Montjeu out of a German-bred dam, Hold On. He was owned by his breeders until bought by Michael Tabor in June 2005.

Racing career

2004: Two-year-old season
Hurricane Run, ridden by Christophe Soumillon won on his only start as a two-year-old.

2005: Three-year-old season
During 2005, Hurricane Run won two Group 1 and two Group 2 races. His victories included the Irish Derby at the Curragh and the Prix de l'Arc de Triomphe at the Longchamp in Paris, ridden on both occasions by Kieren Fallon. His two length win was rated the best performance during the year by the International Federation of Horseracing Authorities. He was scheduled to run at Belmont Park in New York in October in the 2005 Breeders' Cup Turf but was sidelined with a cough. Hurricane Run lost only one race in 2005 when his late charge from behind a wall of horses just failed to catch the winner in the Prix du Jockey Club over a  trip of 10 furlongs.

Hurricane Run was voted the Cartier Racing Award for European Horse of the Year and was the "World's Top Ranked Horse" for 2005 plus the "World's Top Ranked Long Distance Horse" as compiled by the World Thoroughbred Racehorse Rankings.

2006: Four-year-old season
In an uncanny parallel to the career of his sire Montjeu, Hurricane Run's campaign as a four-year-old began brightly, but then tailed off somewhat towards the end of the season. After winning the Tattersalls Gold Cup at The Curragh, he suffered lost the June 25, 2006, Grand Prix de Saint-Cloud in Paris. He returned to action on 29 July, ridden by Christophe Soumillon, to win the King George VI and Queen Elizabeth Stakes at Ascot Racecourse. His season ended with runs in the Prix de l'Arc de Triomphe and Champion Stakes and, finally, the Breeders' Cup Turf.

Stud record

Notable progeny

Hurricane Run sired two individual Group One winners:

c = colt, f = filly, g = gelding

Hurricane Run was retired for the 2007 breeding season to Coolmore Stud in Ireland. His 2012 stud fee was 12,500 Euros.  Hurricane Run was euthanized after complications during an operation on 14 December 2016.

Pedigree

References

External links
 Career 1-2-3 Colour Chart – Hurricane Run

2002 racehorse births
2016 racehorse deaths
Racehorses bred in Ireland
Racehorses trained in France
Arc winners
Irish Classic Race winners
Thoroughbred family 1-l
King George VI and Queen Elizabeth Stakes winners